Megachile obscurior is a species of bee in the family Megachilidae. It was described by Peter Jörgensen in 1912.

References

Obscurior
Insects described in 1912